The 1971–72 NBA season was the Bulls' 6th season in the NBA.

Offseason

Draft picks

Roster

Regular season

Season standings

z – clinched division title
y – clinched division title
x – clinched playoff spot

Record vs. opponents

Game log

Playoffs

|- align="center" bgcolor="#ffcccc"
| 1
| March 28
| @ Los Angeles
| L 80–95
| Jerry Sloan (18)
| Clifford Ray (17)
| Norm Van Lier (4)
| The Forum17,505
| 0–1
|- align="center" bgcolor="#ffcccc"
| 2
| March 30
| @ Los Angeles
| L 124–131
| Bob Love (26)
| Clifford Ray (12)
| Norm Van Lier (10)
| The Forum17,505
| 0–2
|- align="center" bgcolor="#ffcccc"
| 3
| April 2
| Los Angeles
| L 101–108
| Norm Van Lier (22)
| Clifford Ray (20)
| Norm Van Lier (8)
| Chicago Stadium17,805
| 0–3
|- align="center" bgcolor="#ffcccc"
| 4
| April 4
| Los Angeles
| L 97–108
| Clifford Ray (20)
| Clifford Ray (17)
| Norm Van Lier (11)
| Chicago Stadium18,847
| 0–4
|-

Awards and records
Bob Love, All-NBA Second Team
Jerry Sloan, NBA All-Defensive First Team
Norm Van Lier, NBA All-Defensive Second Team
Bob Love, NBA All-Defensive Second Team
Clifford Ray, NBA All-Rookie Team 1st Team
Bob Love, NBA All-Star Game

References

Chicago
Chicago Bulls seasons
Chicago Bulls
Chicago Bulls